Amarcord Brewery (Birra Amarcord), is a brewing company, founded in Rimini in Emilia Romagna, Italy in 1997.  Although the registered office is in Rimini, their brewery is located in Apecchio.

Awards

International Beer Challenge 2011
•	Riserva Speciale – silver medal

See also

List of companies of Italy

References

External links
 Official website in English

Beer brands of Italy
Beer in Italy
Food and drink companies established in 1997
Italian  companies established in 1997